Gräser or Graser is a surname. Notable people with the surname include:

Franz Gräser (1892–1918), Hungarian World War I flying ace
Fritz-Hubert Gräser (1888–1960), German military officer
Gustav Gräser (1879–1958), German alternative lifestyle advocate, artist, and poet
Hulda Regina Graser (1870-1943), Canadian-born American customs house broker
Toni Gräser (born 1933), Swiss racing cyclist